"Pistol" Jim is a western series of comics created In 1944 by Carlos Freixas and is the most famous of his creations.

History 
Carlos Freixas created the series with Emilio Freixas and Ángel Puigmiquel. Jim's adventures appeared in Gran Chicos and later Plaza El Coyote.

Appearance and main characters 
"Pistol" Jim is a vigilante, who wears black (like Hopalong Cassidy) and wears the emblem of a revolver on his chest.

He is  joined on his adventures by his freckly sidekick  Nick Rolly.

Noted amongst  the villains he faces, the sophisticated Belle Smith stands out..

Style 
In the opinion of the researcher Luis Gasca, "Pistol" Jim combines the influence of the styles of Emilio Freixas and Alex Raymond.

References 

Western (genre) comics
Spanish comic strips
1944 comics debuts
Male characters in comics
Vigilante characters in comics